Gabriela Celeste Alaniz (born June 28, 1996) is an Argentine professional female boxer. She is the WBO's female flyweight champion of the world, having won that title on June 18, 2022 from Tamara Elisabet DeMarco. She was also once the Argentine women's national flyweight champion.

A native of Buenos Aires, Alaniz is a resident of the city of Merlo.

Professional boxing career
Alaniz began her professional boxing career by debuting on May 25, 2018, at the age of 21 years old, when she defeated the 1 win, 2 losses Maria Elizabeth Sanchez by a four-rounds unanimous decision at the FAB stadium in Buenos Aires.

Her second fight was her first in her adopted hometown of Merlo. In that contest, she beat previously undefeated, the 2 wins, 0 losses and 1 draw (tie) Aixa Adema by a six-rounds unanimous decision.

Argentina national champion
Alaniz won four more contests, all by decision, before she challenged for her first professional title: She boxed Anyelen Loreley Espinosa for the FAB's vacant, national women's flyweight title. Alaniz faced Espinosa on Saturday, 29 February 2020 at the Club Atletico Lanus in Lanus, Argentina. In her first professional championship fight, Alaniz also scored her first knockout as a professional boxer, as she dropped Espinosa in round one before winning by stoppage in round four. That win was followed by five more victories before she challenged for the WBO world championship. Three of those fights were knockout or technical knockout wins, but none were in defense of her national title. One was a rematch victory over Aixa Adema, who by now sported a record of 3 wins, 5 losses and 2 draws, in a contest held as part of a program headlined by a fight between Maira Moneo and Ana Romina Guichapani, Alaniz being triumphant by an eight-rounds unanimous decision.

World champion
On June 18, 2022, Alaniz fought Tamara Elisabet DeMarco, for DeMarco's WBO world flyweight championship, in a fight that was televised to the Americas by TyC Sports' weekends boxing show, Boxeo de Primera. DeMarco had 10 wins and 4 losses in 14 professional contests before their fight. Alaniz, however, dominated the contest, dropping the champion twice in the first round and controlling the bout's pace until the champion's corner threw in their towel after the bell to start round seven had sounded, signifying that they were stopping the fight, and giving Alaniz her first world boxing championship by way of a seventh-round technical knockout. The fight was held in front of Alaniz' hometown fans at the Club Ferro Carril Oeste in Merlo.

On September 24, 2022, Alaniz made the first defense of her world championship, dominating Venezuelan challenger Debora Rengifo, 18-9-1 with 10 knockouts before their contest, dropping Rengifo in round seven, on her way to a ninth round technical knockout victory. The fight was also telecast on Boxeo de Primera.

Record
Alaniz is undefeated and untied in 14 professional boxing contests, with 6 of her wins coming by way of knockout.

See also
List of Argentines
Marcela Acuna
Yesica Bopp
Erica Farias

References

1996 births
Living people
Argentine women boxers
World flyweight boxing champions
People from Buenos Aires